Henry "Pat" Parrott Bacot, Jr. (December 13, 1941 – October 10, 2020) was an American art historian, curator, and educator. A scholar of Southern art, specifically that of Louisiana, Bacot served as Professor of Art History Emeritus and Executive Director of the LSU Museum of Art at Louisiana State University.

Career
Born in Shreveport to Henry Sr. and Martha Jane Van Loan, Bacot earned a Bachelor of Arts in History from Baylor University in 1963 and a Master of Arts in Museology and American Folk Art from State University of New York at Oneonta in 1972.

In 1967, Bacot began working as a Curator at the LSU Museum of Art and an Instructor of Art History at Louisiana State University. In 1983, he was promoted to Professor of Art History and Executive Director of the museum. Bacot would retire from the university in 2008.

Throughout his career, he focused on Southern art, specifically that of Louisiana. Bacot studied artists such as Caroline Durieux, Pietro Gualdi, and Marie Adrien Persac, as well as eighteenth- and nineteenth-century furniture and decorative arts from the area. His 2000 book on Persac was awarded the Ruth Emery Award for best regional book in that year.

Bacot died in 2020. Two years later, the LSU Museum of Art began an annual lecture in his name called the H. Parrott Bacot Distinguished Visiting Scholar Series, which focuses on the decorative arts.

Works
Nineteenth Century Lighting: Candle-Powered Devices, 1783-1883, 1987 
Marie Adrien Persac: Louisiana Artist, 2000

See also
List of Baylor University people
List of people from Shreveport, Louisiana

References

External links
Louisiana State University profile

Living people
1941 births
Writers from Shreveport, Louisiana
American art curators
American art historians
Baylor University alumni
State University of New York at Oneonta alumni
Louisiana State University faculty